Geoffrey ("Geoff") Smith (born 24 October 1953) is a British long-distance runner who won the Boston Marathon in both 1984 and 1985. He was born in Liverpool. He represented Great Britain at the Summer Olympics twice, in the 10,000 m in 1980 and in the marathon in 1984.

Smith's best time in the marathon was 2:09:08, when he finished second to Rod Dixon in the New York City Marathon in 1983, his first attempt at the marathon distance. Smith only lost by nine seconds. He won the 1984 Boston Marathon by over four minutes. He was the last person to win the Boston Marathon before the race organizers began giving out prize money to the winners.

He ran a sub-four-minute mile in 1982, recording 3:55 minutes in Wales. In 1982 he won the world class Bermuda 10K on a very hilly course in a record time of 28:14, although many world class runners have attempted this race over the years since, none have been any closer than 54 seconds behind this record.

Smith worked as a firefighter for ten years in the United Kingdom, joining the profession straight out of high school. He later went back to study, enrolling at Providence College in Rhode Island at the age of 26 in 1980. He remained in the United States and began working as a middle school teacher and lives in Mattapoisett, Massachusetts as of 2004. He ceased running the Boston Marathon after 1990 and stopped running completely in the early 1990s, having suffered hip problems since birth. He has had both hips replaced and has started running again in June 2013. He coaches local runners South of Boston.

Marathons

International competitions

See also
 List of winners of the Boston Marathon

References

External links
1980 Year Ranking

1953 births
Living people
People from Mattapoisett, Massachusetts
Sportspeople from Plymouth County, Massachusetts
Sportspeople from Liverpool
English male marathon runners
Olympic athletes of Great Britain
Athletes (track and field) at the 1980 Summer Olympics
Athletes (track and field) at the 1984 Summer Olympics
World Athletics Championships athletes for Great Britain
Boston Marathon male winners
Providence College alumni